Iwo Cyprian Pogonowski (3 September 1921 – 21 July 2016) was a Polish-born polymath and inventor with 50 patents to his credit. He was a civil and industrial engineer by profession, educated in Poland, Belgium, and the United States. He was also a writer on Polish and European history, author of historical atlases, and a lexicographer.

Life
Pogonowski was born in Lwów, Poland. After the invasion of Poland in World War II, in December 1939 Pogonowski, aged 18, left Warsaw with the intent of joining the Polish Armed Forces in the West. He was arrested in Dukla by the German authorities on suspicion of aiming to join the resistance. He was moved between prisons and camps for five years thereafter. Interned at the Krosno, Jasło, and Tarnów prisons among others, he was sent with 500 prisoners to Auschwitz, and from there, several months later, to Oranienburg-Sachsenhausen.  He survived the camps and was liberated on 2 May 1945.  Pogonowski summarized his  experiences at the Nazi concentration camps in a three-page article popularized in Richard C. Lukas'  Out of the Inferno. In 1954 he graduated in Civil Engineering at the Catholic University: Institute Superieur de Commerce in Antwerp. He moved to the United States and in the following years worked as a project engineer in the oil industry.

Historian and lexicographer
Pogonowski published an illustrated history of Poland (2000), historical atlases and a work on Polish heraldry (2002).

Pogonowski's Jews in Poland was praised by M.K. Dziewanowski, who called the book a "pioneering attempt [to] 'encompass' Jews within the Polish discourse, a rarity in American scholarship and in the discourse about Jews." He was criticized by Piotr Wróbel and Joanna Michlic, who believes him to represent the ethnonationalist trend in historiography.

Pogonowski compiled several Polish-English, English-Polish dictionaries which have appeared since 1981, including his Unabridged Polish-English Dictionary (3 volumes, New York, Hippocrene Books, 1997; some 100,000 entries) and the Polish-English, English-Polish Standard Dictionary (1985, reprinted 1993, 1994 and 1997).

His journalistic work includes broadcasts for the Polish religious radio station Radio Maryja and columns for its sister publication, Nasz Dziennik (Our Daily). He has also written columns in the Polish-American biweekly, Gwiazda Polarna.

Publications

Dictionaries
 Practical Polish-English Dictionary, Hippocrene Books, 1981.
 Polish-English, English-Polish Standard Dictionary, Hippocrene Books, 1985.
 Compact Polish-English Dictionary, Hippocrene Books, 1985.
 Polish Phrasebook and Dictionary: Complete Phonetics for English Speakers, 103 pp., 1991.
 Unabridged Polish-English Dictionary, 3 volumes, New York, Hippocrene Books, 1997.

History
 Poland:  A Historical Atlas, revised edition, New York, Hippocrene Books, 1989.
 The Jews in Poland:  A Documentary History; the Rise of [the] Jews as a Nation from Congressus Judaicus in Poland to the Knesset in Israel, New York, Hippocrene Books, 1993.
 Świat po amerykańsku, Fundacja 'Nasza Przyszłość', 2004.
 Heraldyka – Heraldry, CD-ROM, published by Juliusz Ostrowski, 2002.
 Poland: An Illustrated History, Hippocrene Books, 2000 (recommended by Norman Davies and Zbigniew Brzeziński).
 Jews in Poland: A Documentary History, New York, Hippocrene Books, 1998.
 Historyczny Atlas Polski (A Historical Atlas of Poland), Wydawnictwo Baran i Suszczyński, 1995.
 Poland: A Historical Atlas, New York, Hippocrene Books, 1987.
 Hegemonia – On US Foreign Policy, Poznań, WERS, 2008.
 The First Democracy in Modern Europe: Million Free Citizens in Poland during the Renaissance, 2010 (E-Book).

See also
List of lexicographers
List of Poles

References

External links
 Richard C. Lukas,  Out of the Inferno, pp. 139–42. University Press of Kentucky, 
 Iwo Cyprian Pogonowski's website.

1921 births
2016 deaths
Writers from Lviv
20th-century Polish historians
Polish male non-fiction writers
Polish lexicographers
Polish industrial engineers
Polish heraldists
Burials at Rakowicki Cemetery
Polish expatriates in Belgium
Polish expatriates in the United States
Auschwitz concentration camp survivors